Konrad Talmont-Kamiński (born 1 January 1971 in Chojnice, Poland) is an analytic philosopher and cognitive scientist, dealing with epistemology, philosophy of science, philosophy of mind and the theory of rationality. His work is also influenced by psychology, biology, history, anthropology and other disciplines.

He obtained his BA in History and Philosophy of Science from the University of Melbourne in Melbourne in 1994, his MA from the University of Western Ontario in London, Ontario, Canada in 1995, and his doctorate from Monash University in Melbourne in 1999, under the supervision of John Bigelow, PhD He then moved to Poland in 2001, where he first worked for the Polish Academy of Science, and later in the Maria Curie-Skłodowska University in Lublin, the Warsaw University of Finance and Management in Warsaw, Psychology Department, and University of Białystok in Białystok. He publishes in journals such as The Monist, Frontiers in Psychology and Religion, Brain and Behavior, and Skeptical Inquirer magazine.

During his scholarship at the Konrad Lorenz Institute for Evolution and Cognition Research in Vienna, Austria he began working on the cognitive basis of supernatural beliefs (superstitions, magic, and religion). The work resulted in a book published in 2014 Religion as a Magical Ideology: How the Supernatural Reflects Rationality, for which he received his habilitation in 2014. He also presents his works in many conferences in Australia and Europe. He will be a speaker at the 17th European Skeptics Congress in Wrocław, Poland, where he will give a speech: Cognition and the Science/Religion Debate.

His current interests are the empirical implications of the model proposed in the book, connecting ritualised behaviour with superstition, and the development of a broadly Peircean account of reason.

Publications 
Selected publications:
 Commentary: Why Do You Believe in God?
 Commentary: Religious credence is not factual belief
 For God and Country, Not Necessarily for Truth: The Nonalethic Function of Superempirical Beliefs
 Why Do You Believe in God?
 Explaining representation, naturally
 Effective untestability and bounded rationality help in seeing religion as adaptive misbelief

Books 
List of books by Konrad Talmont-Kamiński:
 Religion as Magical Ideology: How the Supernatural Reflects Rationality (Religion, Cognition and Culture) 
 Regarding the Mind, Naturally: Naturalist Approaches to the Sciences of the Mental 
 Beyond Description: Naturalism and Normativity (Texts in Philosophy)

Lectures and interviews 
 Interview: How can philosophy inform the science and religion dialogue?
 Lecture about magical thinking and religion
 Presentation of Konrad Talmont-Kamiński as a lecturer (in Polish)
 Why are religions so permanent? (in Polish)
 Lecture about ritualisation of human behaviour (in Polish)

Reviews 
 Review – The Cambridge Companion to the Philosophy of Biology
 Review – Re-Engineering Philosophy for Limited Beings

References 

1971 births
Australian philosophers
Analytic philosophers
Polish cognitive scientists
Living people